Freedom from Fear is both an essay by Aung San Suu Kyi, and a book of the same name comprising a collection of her essays published in 1991.

In honor of Aung San Suu Kyi and the human rights abuses in Burma, The Freedom Campaign released a feature documentary film entitled Freedom from Fear in 2008.  A preview is available at the Freedom Campaign's website.

Notes

References
 Freedom from Fear, Aung San Suu Kyi, Penguin Books, 1991, 
 Freedom from Fear, essay by Aung San Suu Kyi

Essays about politics
Aung San Suu Kyi
1991 non-fiction books
Essay collections